The Jabalpur - Yeshwantpur (Bangalore) Weekly Express (Train No :12194) is a 2014 launched, 2013 announced train service in the rail budget 2013-2014 by rail minister, Pawan Bansal.

Origin and Destination
The train runs between Jabalpur Junction on Saturday, the main railway station of Important military hub of central Indian state, Madhya Pradesh and Yeshwantpur railway station, the sub urban railway station of Bangalore, the capital city of Karnataka.

The train is the fifth point to point connection of Jabalpur with Bangalore after Sanghamitra Express, Bagmati Express, Lucknow - Jabalpur – Yeshwantpur Express and Bareilly Express (not to be confused with Bareilly - New Bhuj Ala Hazrat Express).

Schedule

RSA - Rake Sharing

11449 / 11450 - Jabalpur - Shri Mata Vaishno Devi Katra - Durgavati Express

Coach composite
The train will consist of 22 coaches:
 2 AC II Tier
 4 AC III Tier
 9 Sleeper
 4 General
 2 SLR/EOG
 1 Pantry

Route and Halt
The train travels via. Dharmawaram Junction.
Kachiguda(Hyderabad), kazipet, Ramagundam, Balharshah, Nagpur, Itarsi

References

 http://zeenews.india.com/business/budget-2013/railway-budget-2013-14-list-of-new-trains_70949.html
 http://indiarailinfo.com/train/7930

Express trains in India
Rail transport in Madhya Pradesh
Transport in Bangalore
Transport in Jabalpur
Rail transport in Karnataka
Rail transport in Andhra Pradesh
Rail transport in Telangana
Rail transport in Maharashtra
Railway services introduced in 2014